Komarovo is a rural locality (a selo) in Sokolovsky Selsoviet, Zonalny District, Altai Krai, Russia. The population was 427 as of 2013. There are 10 streets.

Geography 
Komarovo is located 36 km southwest of Zonalnoye (the district's administrative centre) by road. Sokolovo is the nearest rural locality.

References 

Rural localities in Zonalny District